Ethnikos Piraeus Volleyball Club is the volleyball department of the Greek multisport club of Ethnikos Piraeus, based in Piraeus. It is one of the oldest sport sections of the club with presence since 1920s. The colours of the club are blue and white and its home arena is the municipal gymnasium of Piraeus "Panagiotis Salpeas'

History
Ethnikos Piraeus took part in an unofficial championship of 1927 regulated by SEGAS. Since 1940s, Ethnikos takes part in the championships continuously. The 1974-75 season, it played for first time in A' Ethniki (1st-tier championship). So far has played in A' Ethniki five times (1975, 1976, 1980, 1981, 1990). The last season, Ethnikos played in A2 Ethniki and finished in 4th place.

Recent seasons

References

External links
 ethnikos.gr 
Ethnikos in the Volleyleague's website

Greek volleyball clubs
Ethnikos Piraeus